Hip Hop Show is Triple J's show dedicated to hip hop.
Broadcast Thursday nights 9 pm - 11 pm it is hosted by Hau Latukefu. Latukefu replaced Maya Jupiter on 14 April 2008.
The show usually features new and upcoming albums and artists as well as an artist live in the studio throughout some of the night.

The Hip Hop Show is also rebroadcast on Radio Australia since 2010.

External links
 The Hip Hop Show on Triple J

Triple J programs
Hip hop music radio programs